Suren Safaryan (born 26 March 1983), also known as Safar, is an Armenian artist.

Biography
Suren Safaryan graduated from Yerevan State Academy of Fine Arts, Painting Department in 2006. He is a member of UNIMA-Armenia (2002), Artists’ Union of Armenia (2008), Artists’ Trade Union of Russia (2009) “Association Internationale des Arts Plastiques UNESCO” (2009). Since 2012 he is the Co-Chairman of AUA’s Youth Coalition. In 2013 was elected member of AUA governing board. Since 2010 he has participated in the organization of a number of exhibitions. In 2001 Suren Safar was the stage designer of the Armenian stand of the “Yes to children” UNICEF world movement (Perugia, Italy).

Exhibitions
 Gallery of Kempinski Boulevard (Berlin, 2001)
 «FIDEM» world exhibition (Paris, 2002)
 Beijing 3rd International Art Biennale, (Beijing, 2008)
 3rd International Art Exhibition of Moscow, (Moscow, 2009)
 3rd International Art Biennale of Florence (Florence, 2009)
 Exhibition dedicated to the 20th Anniversary of Armenia’s Independence (Beijing, 2011)
 “Public Diplomacy Future of CIS Youth’’, member of the Armenian delegation (Moscow, 2011)
 “Autumn Salon” International group exhibition in France, Grande Palais, (Paris, 2012)
  “Salon 2013’’ International group exhibition in Russia (Moscow, 2013), “Days of Armenia” exhibition (Ashgabat, 2014)
 “Testimony” exhibit dedicated to the 100th Anniversary of the Armenian Genocide (Yerevan, 2015)
 “ЦДХ-2016: The Image of Time” Exhibition (Moscow, 2016)
 “Armenia: Reflections through Generations” AGBU exhibition (Yerevan, 2016)

One-man exhibitions
 “Albert and Tove Boyajian” Gallery (Yerevan, 2006)
 the Castle of Lyubliana museum (Lyubliana, 2010)
 “Bercsenyi Zsuzsanna” gallery (Budapest, 2012)
 Artists’ Union of Armenia (Yerevan 2016)

Gallery

See also
List of Armenian artists
List of Armenians
Culture of Armenia

References

External links
 Suren Safaryan (Safar)
 Art-Safar

1983 births
Armenian painters
Living people
Artists from Yerevan